Buwaydat al-Suwayqat (also spelled Bweidat al-Sweiqat) is a village in northwestern Syria, administratively part of the Tartus Governorate. It is located between Safita (to the east) and Ras al-Khashufah (to the west). According to the Syria Central Bureau of Statistics, (CBS) Buwaydat al-Suwayqat had a population of 2,835 in the 2004 census. Its inhabitants are predominantly Alawites.

References

Populated places in Safita District
Alawite communities in Syria